Bolivia debuted in the OTI Festival in 1972 and since then, the country participated uninterruptedly till the last edition of the show in 2000. Bolivia is one of the least lucky countries participating in the event. In fact, Bolivisión and Televisión Boliviana, the two Bolivian OTI full member stations only managed to enter the top 10 on two occasions: The first one in Madrid 1972 with Arturo Quesada and his entry "No volveré a pasar por allí" (I won't pass by there again) composed by the Spaniards Manuel De la Calva and Ramón Arcusa, (Members of Dúo Dinámico). Their second and last top 10 position came in 1994 in Valencia with Gilka Gutierrez and her song "Para poder hablar de amor" (To be able to talk about love) which got the 8th place in the contest.

Bolivia withdrew from the event from 1975 to 1980 and then, withdrew again in 1981 because the poor placings and the dire economic situation of the participating broadcasters.

Bolivia never won the OTI contest and never hosted it.

Contestants

References 

OTI Festival